Marco Jovanni Rojas Jiménez (born February 1, 1995) is a professional Mexican footballer who currently plays for Cruz Azul Hidalgo on loan from C.F. Pachuca. He made his professional debut for Pachuca during a Copa MX defeat to Alebrijes de Oaxaca on 27 August 2013.

References

1995 births
Living people
Mexican footballers
Association football midfielders
C.F. Pachuca players
Tlaxcala F.C. players
Cruz Azul Hidalgo footballers
Liga Premier de México players
Footballers from Mexico City